A regional election took place in Auvergne on 21 March and 28 March 2004, along with all other regions. Pierre-Joël Bonté (PS) was elected President, defeating incumbent Valéry Giscard d'Estaing, a former President of France.

External links
 Minister of the Interior (France) 2004 official results

Politics of Auvergne
 
Auvergne regional election